This is a list of people who are important or notable in the field of computing, but who are not primarily computer scientists or programmers.

A
 Alfred Aho, co-developer of the AWK
 Leonard Adleman, encryption (RSA)
 Marc Andreessen, co-founder of Netscape Communications Corporation

B
 Tim Berners-Lee, inventor of the World Wide Web
 Stephen Bourne, developer of the Bourne shell

C
 John Carmack, realtime computer game graphics, id Software
 Noam Chomsky, linguist, language theorist (Chomsky hierarchy) and social critic

D
 Theo de Raadt, founder of the OpenBSD and OpenSSH projects

E
J. Presper Eckert, ENIAC
Larry Ellison, co-founder of Oracle Corporation
Marc Ewing, creator of Red Hat Linux

F

G
 Bill Gates, co-founder and Chairman of Microsoft
 James Gosling, "father" of the Java programming language

H
 Grace Hopper, she was a pioneer of computer programming who invented one of the first linkers.

I
 Jonathan Ive, Senior Vice President of Industrial Design at Apple

J
 Steve Jobs, co-founder and CEO of Apple
 Bill Joy, co-founder of Sun Microsystems, BSD

K
 Brian Kernighan, Dennis Ritchie, programming language C
 Donald Knuth, The Art of Computer Programming, TeX

L
 Rasmus Lerdorf, creator of the PHP Scripting Language
 Lawrence Lessig, professor of law and founder of the Creative Commons
 Ada Lovelace

M
 John William Mauchly, ENIAC
 John McCarthy, LISP programming language
 Bob Miner, co-founder of Oracle Corporation
 Marvin Minsky, AI luminary
 Gordon E. Moore, co-founder of Intel, Moore's Law
 Elon Musk, co-founder of PayPal, Tesla, Inc, SpaceX,

N
 Roger Needham
 John von Neumann, theoretical computer science
 Robert Noyce, co-founder of Intel and the founder of integrated circuit

P
 Sir John Anthony Pople, pioneer in computational chemistry
 Jon Postel, Internet pioneer, founder of IANA

Q

R
 Eric Raymond, Open Source movement luminary
 Dennis Ritchie
 Ron Rivest, encryption (RSA)
 Guido van Rossum, Python (programming language) Benevolent Dictator For Life

S
 Adi Shamir, encryption (RSA)
 Mark Shuttleworth, founder of Canonical
 Richard Stallman, founder of GNU
 Olaf Storaasli, NASA Finite element machine
 Bjarne Stroustrup, founder of C++

T
 Linus Torvalds, Linux
 Alan Turing, British mathematician and cryptographer

U

V

W
 Prof. Joseph Weizenbaum, computer critic
 Kevin Warwick, cyborg scientist, implant self-experimenter
 Niklaus Wirth, developed Pascal
 Peter J. Weinberger, co-developer of the AWK language
 Sophie Wilson, designer of the ARM instruction set
 Stephen Wolfram, founder of Wolfram Research, physicist, software developer, mathematician
 Steve Wozniak, co-founder of Apple; creator of the Apple I and Apple II computers

X

Y

Z
 Jill Zimmerman, James M. Beall Professor of Mathematics and Computer Science at Goucher College
 Konrad Zuse, built one of the first computers
 Mark Zuckerberg, co-founder of Facebook "Lizard Man" Reptilian conspiracy theory

See also 
 List of programmers
 List of computer scientists
 List of pioneers in computer science
 List of Russian IT developers

Computing
Computing people